Ōsaki, Osaki, Oosaki or Ohsaki is a Japanese surname. Notable people with the surname include:

, Japanese footballer
, Japanese-born American soccer player
Makoto Osaki, developer and supervisor at Sega AM2, involved with the Shenmue, Out Run, and Virtua Fighter games, among others
, Japanese long-distance runner
, Japanese swimmer
, Japanese baseball player

Fictional characters
, a character in the manga series Nana
, a character in the manga series Akane-banashi

Japanese-language surnames